Kavaközü, Kızılcahamam is a village in the District of Kızılcahamam, Ankara Province, Turkey.

Infrastructure Information 

There is primary schools in the village, but not used. The village have drinking water network, electricity and telephone.

References

Villages in Kızılcahamam District